DeSoto Square Mall was an enclosed shopping mall serving Bradenton, Florida, United States. It was built in 1973 and permanently closed on April 30, 2021. One lone anchor store, Hudson's Furniture, remains open.

History
Starting in November 1971, an entity named Bradenton Mall Corporation would buy  along US 301 and Cortez Road for $1.6 million from 32 property owners. Bradenton's mayor, A.K. Leach, was concerned that the mall which was outside of city limits would impact retailers in the downtown area but he thought they would be able to manage through it.

The center would be built by Edward J. DeBartolo Corporation in 1973. It was originally to be called Bradenton Mall, but the name was determined unacceptable by city officials because the mall was not located within city limits. The company decided to change the name to DeSoto Square Mall in response. A spokesman for DeBartolo corporation said the corporation thought it would identify more with the local community because of the annual DeSoto Celebration. Richard Turner, the president of the Manatee County Conquistador Group, suggested the name as he thought it would draw more attention to the celebration.

The mall had its grand opening on August 15, 1973, with about 37 shops open and 47 still expected. At the time of its opening, the mall had three pre-planned anchor stores: Sears, JCPenney and Maas Brothers. JCPenney did not initially open in August 1973 and instead ended up opened in January 1974 being the last pre-planned anchor store to open.  During the mall's initially opening, Piccadilly Cafeteria would open and remain until May 2003. Cafeterias were popular in shopping malls popular prior to food courts replacing them. A Montgomery-Roberts department store would be added in November 1973.

Future president Ronald Reagan would visit the mall on February 26, 1976, while he was campaigning for president that year. Parking facilities would be expanded in 1978 which led to the demolition of the Suncoast Motel. The motel was originally named Pike's Court and opened in 1953 with Leonard and Edith Pike owning it. The motel would be sold in 1956 to Mary Biggs who renamed it to Suncoast Motel. Belk-Lindsey was added as a fourth anchor in June of 1979, after having been evicted from a nearby store at Cortez Plaza.

Burdines expressed interest in opening a store at DeSoto Square as early as 1979, though they did not join the mall until 1991 when the company merged with Maas Brothers.  The Maas Brothers store was officially rebranded as Burdines on October 20, 1991.  A year later, Belk sold its store in the mall to Dillard's. During the late 1980s there would be "talk about adding a food court" but nothing materialized.  A food court named Port O'Call with a tropical theme would open in April 1997. After the food court not all of the restaurants in the mall would relocate there. Notably during the opening ceremony, Dawn Wells who played the character Mary Ann on the television show Gilligan's Island would appear as a judge for a contest for who could dress the best as a castaway from the show. Old Navy was added in 2000. Burdines was renamed Burdines-Macy's on January 30, 2004 as the brands were merged by their parent company.  On March 6, 2005, the Burdines name was officially dropped and the stores were fully merged into Macy's.

Several stores closed in 2009 due to the declining economy, including Old Navy, Foot Locker, Waldenbooks and the Dillard's anchor. The Old Navy space became a family entertainment center called Saturn 5 in 2010.

In May 2012, Simon Property Group (which bought out DeBartolo in 1996) announced plans to sell the mall. In November of that year, Mason Asset Management acquired the mall for $25 million. Macy's announced the closure of its store at the mall in July 2014, which relocated to the Mall at University Town Center. The theater closed a month later. In 2015, Sears Holdings spun off 235 of its properties, including the Sears at DeSoto Square Mall, into Seritage Growth Properties. Mason Asset Management sold the mall for $25.5 million to New York-based Meyer Lebovitz in March 2017. Lebovitz owned DeSoto Owners LLC. Lebovitz chose Madison Properties USA LLC for the task of redeveloping and leasing the mall. Jerrell M. Davis, president of the Madison Properties Southeast Region, would oversee the project. The mall would be used by FEMA as a disaster recovery center after Hurricane Irma hit Florida.

In January 2018, Your Treasure House, a retail store and auction house, opened on the first floor of the former Macy's location. In July 2018, it was briefly rebranded as "Midtown DeSoto Square Mall", as part of plans to renovate and expand the mall. When those plans fell apart, the rebranding was dropped. Sears would announce on October 15, 2018, that it would be closing as part of a plan to close 142 stores nationwide.

Your Treasure House closed in late 2019 leaving the former Macy's space vacant again. On December 13, 2019, it was announced that the former Sears would be converted to a self-storage facility. The mall would go into default on its mortgage on January 20, 2020, and a judgement of foreclosure of $29.3 million would be given. JCPenney announced on June 4 that it would be closing on October 18 as part of a plan to close 154 stores nationwide which left Hudson's Furniture as the only anchor left. A foreclosure sale would originally be scheduled to occur on September 23 but DeSoto Owners LLC would file for bankruptcy a day prior to the sale.

On April 29, 2021, it was announced that the mall would officially close the next day, April 30, 2021. The day the mall closed it would have 4 stores in it. Sometime prior to the mall's closing DeSoto Owners LLC would file for bankruptcy once again to try as it tried to restructure the company's finances and give themselves more time.

Anchors

Former anchors
 Maas Brothers/Burdines/Macy's (1973–2014)
 Sears (1973–2019)
 Dillard's (1992–2009)
 Belk (1979–1992)
 JCPenney (1974–2020)
 Your Treasure House (2018–2019)

References

Bradenton, Florida
Defunct shopping malls in the United States
Shopping malls in Florida
Shopping malls established in 1973
Shopping malls disestablished in 2021
Tourist attractions in Manatee County, Florida
1973 establishments in Florida
2021 disestablishments in Florida
Companies that filed for Chapter 11 bankruptcy in 2020